Gold Coast Transit District, formerly known as South Coast Area Transit (SCAT), is a local bus operator in western Ventura County, California, serving Ventura,  Oxnard, Port Hueneme, Ojai, and the adjoining areas of unincorporated Ventura County.

History 
Gold Coast Transit District was founded in 1973 as South Coast Area Transit with the merger of the Ventura City Transit Lines and the Oxnard Municipal Bus Lines.
Until 1994, SCAT also served Santa Paula. Service to Santa Paula has since been replaced with VCTC Intercity fixed-route and dial-a-ride services. The system adopted the name Gold Coast Transit effective July 1, 2007.
This accompanied a change in bus livery and the acquisition of 26 new buses.

In October 2013, California Assembly Bill 664 was chartered as the enabling legislation to transition Gold Coast Transit from a joint powers authority to a special purpose transit district. On July 1, 2014, the agency officially became Gold Coast Transit District. The district's founding member jurisdictions include the cities of Ojai, Oxnard, Port Hueneme, and Ventura and the County of Ventura. The bill allows other cities in Ventura County to subsequently join the district.

In 2014, GCTD leadership was recognized with the District being honored as the “Transit Agency of the Year” at the Small Operators award ceremony hosted by the California Transit Association (CTA)

as part of its 49th Annual Conference and Expo in Monterey, California.

On May 10, 2017 Gold Coast Transit District broke ground on a new operations and maintenance facility in Oxnard. The facility opened in July 2019.

Service area 
Gold Coast Transit District provides bus service to these cities and communities:

 Oxnard
 Ventura
 Port Hueneme
 Ojai
 El Rio
 Saticoy
 Oak View
 Mira Monte

Routes 
As of July 2015, Gold Coast Transit District operates 19 fixed-route lines as well as paratransit service.

Fixed Routes

School Trippers 
Gold Coast Transit District operates four "school trippers" that supplement school bus service to local high schools. While intended to serve students with service only on school days, these routes are open to the general public.

References

External links 
 Official website

Bus transportation in California
Public transportation in Ventura County, California
Transportation in Oxnard, California
Special districts of California
Ventura, California
Ojai, California